Armstrong and Miller was a short-lived radio programme that aired in March 1998.  There were four 15-minute episodes and it was broadcast on BBC Radio 4.  It starred Alexander Armstrong, Ben Miller, Samuel West and Tony Gardner.

References
 Lavalie, John. "Armstrong and Miller". EpGuides. 21 Jul 2005. 29 Jul 2005

External links
 EpGuides entry
 Official Armstrong and Miller site

BBC Radio 4 programmes
Armstrong and Miller